The American Declaration of the Rights and Duties of Man, also known as the Bogota Declaration, was the world's first international human rights instrument of a general nature, predating the Universal Declaration of Human Rights by less than a year.

The Declaration was adopted by the nations of the Americas at the Ninth International Conference of American States in Bogotá, Colombia, on 2 May 1948, where we can find most of its travaux préparatoires; the conference and declaration was led and designed chiefly by United States public servants. The same conference adopted the Charter of the Organization of American States and thereby created the OAS.

Chapter One of the Declaration sets forth a catalogue of civil and political rights to be enjoyed by the citizens of the signatory nations, together with additional economic, social, and cultural rights due to them. As a corollary, its second chapter contains a list of corresponding duties. As explained in the preamble:
"The fulfillment of duty by each individual is a prerequisite to the rights of all. Rights and duties are interrelated in every social and political activity of man. While rights exalt individual liberty, duties express the dignity of that liberty."

Although strictly speaking a declaration is not a legally binding treaty, the jurisprudence of both the Inter-American Court of Human Rights and the Inter-American Commission on Human Rights holds it to be a source of binding international obligations for the OAS's member states. While largely superseded in the current practice of the inter-American human rights system by the more elaborate provisions of the American Convention on Human Rights (in force since 18 July 1978), the terms of the Declaration are still enforced with respect to those states that have not ratified the Convention, such as Cuba, the United States, and Canada.

References

External links

Text of the American Declaration of the Rights and Duties of Man
Travaux Préparatoires of the American Declaration of the Rights and Duties of Man

Organization of American States treaties
Human rights instruments
1948 in law
Human rights in Latin America
1948 in international relations
1948 in Colombia
1948 documents